Charles Ford Smith was an English footballer who played in the Football League for Bolton Wanderers and Bournemouth & Boscombe Athletic.

References

English footballers
Association football midfielders
English Football League players
Bolton Wanderers F.C. players
AFC Bournemouth players